Aimée-Olympe Desclée (born in Paris, November 16, 1836 – March 8, 1874) was a French actress, recognized for her performances in contemporary French emotional plays. She acted with success in London and also performed in Belgium and Russia. She was reviewed as one of the best actresses of her time and was romantically linked to many famous artists of the day.

Career 
Desclée was known for her emotionally-fraught roles, notably in the plays of the younger Alexandre Dumas and contemporaries praised the new realism she brought to the passionately wayward women she portrayed.

Personal life 
Henry James, the American novelist, in his essay The Parisian Stage, 1872, described the actress as having "...mastery of the fine shades of expression". A series of her love letters was published at the end of the 19th century.

Death and burial 

She died at the early age of 37. Her funeral took place on March 11, 1874, at the church of Saint-Laurent in the presence of "a considerable crowd" according to Le Temps, including representatives from all the Parisian theaters.

A funeral monument to her memory by Alexandre Dumas, Fromental Halévy , Meilhac and Montigny-le-Bretonneux was built on March 9, 1875. Originally, the tomb was surmounted by a bronze bust made by sculptor Albert-Ernest Carrier-Belleuse representing Desclée in the title role of Frou-Frou. 

In November 2006, the bust was stolen by thieves who raided the cemetery but was later recovered. The bust currently resides at Los Angeles County Museum of Art, but is not on display.

References

1836 births
1874 deaths
19th-century French actresses